Platensina guttatolimbata is a species of tephritid or fruit flies in the genus Platensina of the family Tephritidae.

Distribution
Madagascar.

References

Tephritinae
Insects described in 1911
Diptera of Asia